The Offerman Building is a historic Romanesque Revival building in Downtown Brooklyn, New York City. Designed by architect Peter J. Lauritzen, the building is eight stories tall, and was originally built to house the S. Wechsler & Brothers department store. In 2017 it was converted into a 121-unit residential complex.

References

External links

Downtown Brooklyn
National Register of Historic Places in Brooklyn
Renaissance Revival architecture in New York City
Commercial buildings completed in 1893